The 1973 Swedish Pro Tennis Championships was a men's tennis tournament played on indoor carpet courts. It was the 2nd and final edition of Swedish Pro Tennis Championships, and was part of the 1973 World Championship Tennis circuit. It took place at the Scandinavium in Gothenburg, Sweden, from 23 April through 29 April 1973. First-seeded Stan Smith won the singles title.

Finals

Singles
 Stan Smith defeated  John Alexander, 5–7, 6–4, 6–2
 It was Smith's 6th title of the year, and his 22nd overall. It was his 6th WCT title of the year, and his 7th overall.

Doubles
 Roy Emerson /  Rod Laver defeated  Nikola Pilić /  Allan Stone, 6–7, 6–4, 6–1

See also
 1973 Swedish Open
 1973 Stockholm Open

References

 
Swedish Pro Tennis Championships
1973